Peperomia alata, commonly known as the winged peperomia, is a species of plant in the genus Peperomia of the family Piperaceae. Its native range covers most of tropical and subtropical America, from southern North America through West Indies and Central America to South America. It can also be found in Florida, although there it is apparently rare, known for certain only from swamps in Collier County.

Description
Peperomia alata is a perennial herb, erect or reclining, spreading by rhizomes. The epithet "alata," i.e., "winged," refers to wings that run the length of the stems, although this is rather obscure on some specimens. Leaves are 3-veined, elliptic to lanceolate, with blades up to 13 cm (5.2 inches) long. Flowers are born in tight spikes up to 13 cm (5.2 inches) long.

References

alata
Flora of Florida
Flora of South America